Nanorana is a genus of dicroglossid frogs. They are found in Asia, from the Himalayan region of northern Pakistan and northern India, Nepal, and western China east to montane southern China and southeast to Myanmar, Thailand, Laos, and northern Vietnam. Common names of these frogs reflect the complex taxonomic history of the genus (see below) and include Yunnan slow frogs (or simply slow frogs) and High Himalaya frogs (for the now-synonymized genus Altirana).

Taxonomy
The taxonomy of true frogs and their allies has been subject to numerous changes during the last decade and is not yet fully settled. Nanorana in particular has seen big changes. As currently delineated, Nanorana is a quite large genus with 28 species, resulting from considering Chaparana, Paa, and Feirana as junior synonyms. Currently these taxa may be recognized as subgenera, but their delineation is not entirely settled and not all species have been assigned to subgenera. Note, however, that species at one point placed in these (sub)genera might currently be placed also in genera other than Nanorana (Quasipaa, Ombrana, and Allopaa).

Species
The following species are recognised in the genus Nanorana:

References

 
Dicroglossidae
Amphibian genera
Amphibians of Asia
Taxa named by Albert Günther